Jane Crafter (born 14 December 1955) is an Australian-American professional golfer and golf broadcaster for ESPN who played on the LPGA Tour. She has had dual citizenship in Australia and the United States since 2007. Her father Brian was also a professional golfer, while her brother Neil was a leading amateur golfer, representing Australia in the 1984 Eisenhower Trophy.

Before playing professional golf, Crafter worked as a pharmacist for three years.

Crafter won once on the LPGA Tour in 1990. She won three times on the ALPG Tour.

Professional wins (6)

LPGA Tour wins (1)

LPGA Tour playoff record (0-1)

ALPG Tour wins (3)
1992 Alpine Australian Ladies Masters
1996 Alpine Australian Ladies Masters
1997 Toyota Women's Australian Open

Other wins (1)
1987 JCPenney Classic (with Steve Jones)

Legends Tour wins (1)
2013 Fry's Desert Golf Classic (with Betsy King)

Team appearances
Amateur
Commonwealth Trophy (representing Australia): 1979
Tasman Cup (representing Australia): 1978 (tied)
Queen Sirikit Cup (representing Australia): 1980

Professional
Handa Cup (representing World team): 2010, 2012 (tie), 2013 (winners), 2014, 2015

References

External links

Australian female golfers
American female golfers
ALPG Tour golfers
LPGA Tour golfers
Golf writers and broadcasters
Golfers from Phoenix, Arizona
University of South Australia alumni
Australian emigrants to the United States
Golfers from Perth, Western Australia
Sportswomen from Western Australia
1955 births
Living people
21st-century American women